The women's 200 metres event at the 1985 IAAF World Indoor Games was held at the Palais Omnisports Paris-Bercy on 18 January.

Medalists

Results

Heats
First 3 of each heat qualified directly (Q) for the final.

Final

References

200
200 metres at the IAAF World Indoor Championships